Middle Point may refer to:
 Middle Point, Ohio, United States
Middle Point, West Virginia, United States
 Middle Point, Northern Territory, Australia